Curtis is an unincorporated community in Washington. It is located less than 3-miles north of Boistfort and is south of Washington State Route 6. The South Fork Chehalis River flows thru the town.

History

A post office has been in operation since 1901 inside the Curtis General Store. Benjamin L. Curtis, the first postmaster of the area, built the store and gave the community his name. At its founding, the town's economy was based on logging and farming.

Education

The community once had a two-room schoolhouse. Curtis students are now served by the Boistfort School District and the Boistfort Consolidated School.

Government and politics

Politics

Curtis is recognized as being majority Republican and conservative.

The results for the 2020 U.S. Presidential Election for the Curtis voting district were as follows:

 Donald J. Trump (Republican) - 180 (72.87%)
 Joe Biden (Democrat) - 65 (26.32%)
 Jo Jorgensen (Libertarian) - 2 (0.81%)

References

Populated places in Lewis County, Washington
Unincorporated communities in Lewis County, Washington
Unincorporated communities in Washington (state)